Marin Tsenov (Bulgarian: Марин Ценов) (born 10 November 1980 in Burgas) is a Bulgarian football midfielder, who currently plays for Nesebar.

External links
Player Profile

1980 births
Living people
Bulgarian footballers
Association football midfielders
Neftochimic Burgas players
PFC Spartak Varna players
OFC Sliven 2000 players
PFC Chernomorets Burgas players
First Professional Football League (Bulgaria) players